The Kármán line (or von Kármán line ) is a proposed conventional boundary between Earth's atmosphere and outer space set by the international record-keeping body FAI (Fédération aéronautique internationale) at an altitude of  above mean sea level. However, such definition of the edge of space is not universally adopted.

The Kármán line has no particular physical meaning, in that there is no noticeable change in the characteristics of the atmosphere across it, but is important for legal and regulatory purposes, since aircraft and spacecraft are subject to different jurisdictions and legislations. International law does not define the edge of space, or the limit of national airspace.
 
The line lies well above the altitude reachable by a conventional airplane or a high-altitude balloon, and is approximately where satellites, even on very eccentric trajectories, will decay before completing a single orbit.

While experts disagree on exactly where the atmosphere ends and space begins, most regulatory agencies (including the United Nations) accept the FAI's Kármán line definition or something close to it. As defined by the FAI, the Kármán line was established in the 1960s. Various countries and entities define space's boundary differently for various purposes.

The Kármán line is named for Theodore von Kármán (1881–1963), a Hungarian-American engineer and physicist who was active in aeronautics and astronautics. In 1957, he was the first person to attempt to calculate a theoretical limit of altitude for airplane flight.

Definition 
The FAI uses the term Kármán line to define the boundary between aeronautics and astronautics:

Interpretations of the definition 
The expressions "edge of space" or ″near space″ are often used (by, for instance, the FAI in some of their publications) to refer to a region below the boundary of Outer Space, which is often meant to include substantially lower regions as well. Thus, certain balloon or airplane flights might be described as "reaching the edge of space". In such statements, "reaching the edge of space" merely refers to going higher than average aeronautical vehicles commonly would.

There is still no international legal definition of the demarcation between a country's air space and outer space. In 1963, Andrew G. Haley discussed the Kármán line in his book Space Law and Government. In a chapter on the limits of national sovereignty, he made a survey of major writers' opinions. He indicated the inherent imprecision of the Line:
The line represents a mean or median measurement. It is comparable to such measures used in the law as mean sea level, meander line, tide line; but it is more complex than these. In arriving at the von Kármán jurisdictional line, myriad factors must be considered – other than the factor of aerodynamic lift. These factors have been discussed in a very large body of literature and by a score or more of commentators. They include the physical constitution of the air; the biological and physiological viability; and still other factors which logically join to establish a point at which air no longer exists and at which airspace ends.

Kármán's comments 
In the final chapter of his autobiography, Kármán addresses the issue of the edge of outer space:
Where space begins ... can actually be determined by the speed of the space vehicle and its altitude above the Earth. Consider, for instance, the record flight of Captain Iven Carl Kincheloe Jr. in an X-2 rocket plane. Kincheloe flew 2000 miles per hour (3,200 km/h) at 126,000 feet (38,500 m), or 24 miles up. At this altitude and speed, aerodynamic lift still carries 98 percent of the weight of the plane, and only two percent is carried by inertia, or Kepler force, as space scientists call it. But at 300,000 feet (91,440 m) or 57 miles up, this relationship is reversed because there is no longer any air to contribute lift: only inertia prevails. This is certainly a physical boundary, where aerodynamics stops and astronautics begins, and so I thought why should it not also be a jurisdictional boundary? Andrew G. Haley has termed it the Kármán Jurisdictional Line. Below this line, space belongs to each country. Above this level there would be free space.

Technical considerations 
An atmosphere does not abruptly end at any given height but becomes progressively less dense with altitude. The Kármán line thus is a largely arbitrary definition based on some technical considerations.

An aircraft can stay aloft only by constantly traveling forward relative to the air (rather than the ground), so that the wings can generate aerodynamic lift. The thinner the air, the faster the plane must go to generate enough lift to stay up. The amount of lift provided (which must equal the vehicle's weight in order to maintain level flight) is calculated by the lift equation:

 

such that

 L is the lift force,
 ρ is the air density,
 v is the aircraft's speed relative to the air,
 S is the aircraft's wing area,
 CL is the lift coefficient.

Lift (L) generated is directly proportional to the air density (ρ). An aircraft maintains altitude if the lift force equals the aircraft weight such that

 

All other factors remaining unchanged, true airspeed (v) must increase to compensate for lower air density at higher altitudes.

This is the virtual force that keeps satellites in circular orbit without any aerodynamic lift. An aircraft can maintain altitude at the outer reaches of the atmosphere if the sum of the aerodynamic lift force and centrifugal force equals the aircraft weight.

    

As altitude increases and air density decreases, the speed to generate enough aerodynamic lift to support the aircraft weight increases until the speed becomes so high that the centrifugal force contribution becomes significant. At a high enough altitude, the centrifugal force will dominate over the lift force and the aircraft would become effectively an orbiting spacecraft instead an aircraft supported by aerodynamic lift. 

In 1956, von Kármán presented a paper in which he discussed aerothermal limits to flight. The faster aircraft fly, the more heat they would generate due to aerodynamic heating from friction with the atmosphere and adiabatic processes. Based on the current state of the art, he calculated the speeds and altitudes at which continuous flight was possible – fast enough that enough lift would be generated and slow enough that the vehicle would not overheat.

The term "Kármán line" was invented by Andrew G. Haley in a 1959 paper, based on von Kármán's 1956 paper, but Haley acknowledged that the  limit was theoretical and would change as technology improved, as the minimum speed in von Kármán's calculations was based on the speed-to-weight ratio of current aircraft, namely the Bell X-2, and the maximum speed based on current cooling technologies and heat-resistant materials. Haley also cited other technical considerations for that altitude, as it was approximately the altitude limit for an airbreathing jet engine based on current technology.

Alternatives to the FAI definition 

The latter altitude, achieved twice by Walker, exceeds the modern international definition of the boundary of space.

The United States Federal Aviation Administration also recognizes this line as a space boundary:

More precisely, the paper summarizes:

These findings prompted the FAI to propose holding a joint conference with the International Astronautical Federation (IAF) in 2019 to "fully explore" the issue.

Another definition proposed in international law discussions defines the lower boundary of space as the lowest perigee attainable by an orbiting space vehicle, but does not specify an altitude. This is the definition adopted by the U.S. military. The U.S. government is resisting efforts to specify a precise regulatory boundary.

For other planets 

See also

References

External links 
 Article on the Kármán line at the FAI website
 Layers of the Atmosphere – NOAA 
 "The Kármán Line" music video featuring NASA footage
 Kármán line calculator

Aerospace
Atmospheric boundaries
Eponyms
Outer space